Brown is an extinct settlement and former railroad siding  in Lincoln County, in the U.S. state of Nevada.

History
The first settlement at Brown was made in 1905.  In 1941 it was reported that Brown had a population of 10.

References

Ghost towns in Lincoln County, Nevada